The 2002 IHF Super Globe was the second edition. It was held in Doha, Qatar from 3–9 June 2002.
There were just one group playing against each other, so the group ranking was the final ranking.

Al Sadd won the title for the first time.

Round Robin

Match results

External links
Official website

IHF Super Globe
2002
IHF Super Globe
2002 IHF Super Globe
2002 IHF Super Globe